Eugene Edgar Page Jr. (September 13, 1939 – August 24, 1998) was an American conductor, composer, arranger and record producer, most active from the mid-1960s through the mid-1980s.

His sound can be heard in the arrangements he did for Jefferson Starship, the Righteous Brothers, the Supremes, the Four Tops, Barbra Streisand, Johnny Mathis, Donna Loren, Nancy Wilson, Martha and the Vandellas, Cher, Harriet Schock, Barry White, the Love Unlimited Orchestra, Dionne Warwick, Aretha Franklin, Whitney Houston, George Benson, the Jackson 5, Roberta Flack, Elton John ("Philadelphia Freedom"),  Leo Sayer, Marvin Gaye, the Temptations, Lovesmith, Michael Lovesmith, Frankie Valli, Helen Reddy and Lionel Richie among many other notable acts in popular music.

In addition, he released four solo albums and scored various motion picture soundtracks that include Brewster McCloud and Fun with Dick and Jane. In 1972, he was hired to score the Blaxplotation film Blacula.

Gene Page was the brother of musician, songwriter, and producer Billy Page.

Death
Gene Page died after a long-term illness of severe alcoholism at UCLA Medical Center in Westwood, Los Angeles on August 24, 1998 at age 58.

Discography

Studio albums

With Big Joe Turner
The Real Boss of the Blues (BluesTime, 1969)

Singles

See also
 List of music arrangers

References

External links
 
 
 

1939 births
1998 deaths
Record producers from California
20th-century American musicians
20th-century American businesspeople
Atlantic Records artists
Arista Records artists
African-American conductors (music)
American music arrangers
American male conductors (music)
Alcohol-related deaths in California
The Love Unlimited Orchestra members